Culex (Culex) whitmorei is a species of mosquito belonging to the genus Culex. It is found in Australia, Bangladesh, China, India, Indonesia, Japan, South Korea, Laos, Malaysia, Nepal, New Guinea (Island); Papua New Guinea, Pakistan, Philippines, Russia, Sri Lanka, Sudan and South Sudan, Taiwan, Thailand, and Vietnam.

References 

whitmorei
Insects described in 1904